Mud Run is a  tributary of the Bermudian Creek in York and Adams counties, Pennsylvania in the United States.

Mud Run is impounded to form Lake Meade.

See also
List of rivers of Pennsylvania

References

External links
U.S. Geological Survey: PA stream gaging stations

Rivers of Pennsylvania
Tributaries of the Susquehanna River
Rivers of Adams County, Pennsylvania